Roman is a masculine given name meaning  from Rome, which originated within the Roman Empire, via Latin. In its initial sense, the title "Roman", (Romanus in Latin and Romanos in Greek) denotes a member of the Roman Empire, or belonging to or identifying with Roman (or Byzantine) culture. It most likely evolved from Romulus, the legendary co-founder of Rome. 

Due to Byzantine cultural influence the name Roman (the Slavic variant of Romanos/Romanus) is widely used amongst Eastern and Western Slavs. The name day for Roman varies between countries. Román in Spanish is a popular given name in Spanish-speaking countries, especially in Latin-America.

Variations of the name include: 
French: Romain
German: Roman
Hungarian: Román
Italian: Romano
Portuguese: Romão
Spanish: Román
Polish, Czech, Slovak: Roman
Russian, Ukrainian: Роман (Roman)
Belarusian: Раман (Raman)

Roman may refer to:

People named Roman

Pre-20th century
Roman of Đunis (9th century), Christian saint 
Roman of Bulgaria (early 930s – 997), Tsar of Bulgaria
Roman Svyatoslavich (c. 1052 – 1079), Prince of Tmutarakan in Kievan Rus'
Roman I of Kiev (died 1180), Prince of Smolensk, Grand Prince of Kiev and Prince of Novgorod
Roman the Great (c. 1152 – 1205), Grand Prince of Kiev
Roman Danylovich (c. 1230 – c. 1261), Prince of Black Ruthenia (Navahradak), Prince of Slonim?
Roman I of Moldavia, Voivode of Moldavia (1391–1394)
Roman II of Moldavia, co-ruler of Moldavia (1447–1448)
Roman Bagration (1778–1834), Georgian prince and Imperial Russian Army general

Modern
Roman Abramovich (born 1966), Jewish Russian oligarch
Roman Atwood (born 1983), American YouTube personality and prankster
Roman Berezovsky (born 1974), Armenian football coach and former player
Roman Bohnen (1901–1949), American actor
Roman Ciorogariu (1852–1936), Romanian bishop
Roman Coppola (born 1965), American filmmaker, screenwriter, producer and entrepreneur
Roman Griffin Davis (born 2007), English actor
Roman Dmowski (1864–1939), Polish politician
Roman Dzindzichashvili (born 1944), American chess player
Roman Eremenko (born 1987), Finnish football player
Roman Fosti (born 1983), Estonian long-distance runner
Roman Glick, American bass guitarist
Roman Golanowski (born 1969), Polish long jumper
Roman Golovchenko (born 1973), Belarusian politician and current prime minister of Belarus
Roman Greenberg  (born 1982), Israeli boxer
Roman Hamrlík (born 1975), Czech ice hockey player
Roman Harper (born 1982), American football player
Roman Herzog (1934–2017), German politician
Roman Hruska (1904–1999), American politician
Roman Hubník (born 1984), Czech football player
Roman Ingarden (1893–1970), Polish philosopher
Roman Ivanovsky (born 1977), Russian swimmer 
Roman Jakobson (1896–1982), Russian-American philologist
Roman Josi (born 1990), Swiss ice hockey player
Roman Jugg, Welsh punk musician
Roman Kantor (1912–43), Polish épée fencer
Roman Kemp (born 1993), English radio host
Roman Kroitor (1926–2012), Canadian filmmaker
Roman Mars, American radio journalist and producer
Roman Neustädter (born 1988), German football player
Roman Opałka (1931–2011), Polish painter
Roman Pavlyuchenko (born 1981), Russian football player
Roman Polák (born 1986), Czech ice hockey player
Roman Polanski (born 1933), Polish film director
Roman Protasevich, Belarusian journalist, blogger, activist
Roman Ptitsyn (born 1975), Russian politician
Roman Quinn (born 1993), American baseball player
Roman Rasskazov (born 1979), Russian race walker
Roman Repilov (born 1996), Russian luger
Roman Romanenko (born 1971), Russian cosmonaut
Roman Romulo (born 1967), Filipino politician
 Roman Rubinshteyn (born 1996), Belarusian-Israeli basketball player in the Israeli Basketball Premier League 
Roman Rurua (born 1942), Soviet wrestler
Roman Šebrle (born 1974), Czech decathlete
Roman U. Sexl (1939–1986), Austrian physicist
Roman Shirokov (born 1981), Russian football player
Roman Shukhevych (1907–1950), Ukrainian politician and military leader
Roman Smishko (born 1983), Ukrainian football player
Roman Sorkin (born 1996), Israeli basketball player in the Israeli Basketball Premier League
Roman Tam (1950–2002), Hong Kong singer
Roman Toi (1916–2018), Estonian composer
Roman Trakhtenberg (1968–2009), Russian radio journalist
Roman Turovsky-Savchuk (born 1961), American artist
Roman Ubakivi (born 1945), Estonian football player and coach
Roman (Robert) von Ungern-Sternberg (1886–1921), Russian Lieutenant General
Roman Verostko (born 1929), American artist and educator
Roman Vishniac (1897–1990), Russian photographer
Roman Vlasov (born 1990), Russian wrestler
Roman Volodkov (born 1973), Ukrainian diver
Roman Weidenfeller (born 1980), German football player
Roman Yakovlev (born 1976), Russian volleyball player
Roman Yakub (born 1958), American composer
Roman Yaremchuk (born 1995), Ukrainian football player
Roman Yegorov (born 1974), Russian swimmer
Roman Zaretski (born 1983), Belarusian-Israeli ice dancer

Fictional characters
 Roman, a character in the TV series Star-Crossed
 Roman Armitage in Get Out
 Roman Bellic, a character in the video game Grand Theft Auto IV
 Roman Brady, a character in the soap opera Days of Our Lives
 Roman Bridger, a character in the film Scream 3
 Roman DeBeers, a character in the series Party Down
 Roman Godfrey, a character in Hemlock Grove
 Roman Grant, a character in the TV series Big Love
 Roman J. Israel, a character in the film Roman J. Israel, Esq.
 Roman Nagel, a character in the Ocean's Eleven franchise
 Roman Pearce, reformed street racing criminal from The Fast and the Furious series
 Roman Reigns, ring name of professional wrestler Leati Joseph Anoaʻi in WWE
 Roman Roy, a character in the HBO TV series “Succession”
 Roman Sionis, a supervillain appearing in DC comics
 Roman Strauss, protagonist of the 1991 neo-noir film Dead Again
 Roman Zazo, recurring character in the TV series Jane the Virgin

See also
Romain (disambiguation)
Romano (disambiguation)
Romanus (disambiguation)

References

Masculine given names
English masculine given names
Estonian masculine given names
Russian masculine given names
Ukrainian masculine given names
Slovene masculine given names
Croatian masculine given names
Polish masculine given names
Czech masculine given names
Slovak masculine given names
Italian masculine given names
Romanian masculine given names
Bulgarian masculine given names
Hungarian masculine given names
Spanish masculine given names
Portuguese masculine given names
French masculine given names
Georgian masculine given names
German masculine given names